The 2010 United States Senate elections were held on November 2, 2010, from among the United States Senate's 100 seats. A special election was held on January 19, 2010, for a mid-term vacancy in Massachusetts. Thirty-four of the November elections were for six-year terms to the Senate's Class 3, while other three were special elections to finish incomplete terms. Those 37 November elections featured 19 incumbent Democrats (seven of whom retired or were defeated in the primary) and 18 incumbent Republicans (eight of whom retired or were defeated in the primary).

After the 2008 elections, the Senate was composed of 58 Democrats, 40 Republicans, and 2 independents who caucused with the Democrats. Despite losing the popular vote, Democrats retained control of the Senate after the election.

Republicans won four seats held by retiring Democrats and also defeated two incumbent Democrats, for a Republican net gain of six seats. This was the first time since 1994 that Republicans successfully defended all of their own seats. This was also the fourth consecutive election of Class 3 senators where Democrats failed to gain seats, and the third consecutive midterm election held in a president's first term where Republicans picked up seats. Despite the Republican gains, the Democrats retained a majority of the Senate with 51 seats plus the two independents who caucused with them, compared to the 47 Republican seats.

, this was the last time Republicans won U.S. Senate seats in Illinois and New Hampshire.

Results summary 

Shading indicates party with largest share of that line. Does not include the January 2010 special election in Massachusetts.

Source: Clerk of the U.S. House of Representatives

Change in composition

After the January special election

Before the November elections

Result of the November elections

Gains and losses

Retirements
Seven Democrats and six Republicans (including four interim appointees to finish the current 6-year term) retired rather than seek re-election.

Defeats
Three Democrats and one Republican sought re-election but lost in either the primary or general election.

Race summary

Special elections during the 111th Congress 
In these special elections, the winner was seated in the fall of 2010 (excluding Massachusetts), once they qualified and their elections were certified. Sorted by election date, then state, then class.

Elections leading to the next Congress 
Source: 

In these regular elections, the winners were elected for the term beginning January 3, 2011; ordered by state.

All of the elections involved the Class 3 seats.

Closest races 
Seven November races, as well as the Massachusetts special election in January, had margins less than 10%:

California was the tipping point state, where Barbara Boxer (D) defeated Carly Fiorina (R) by a margin of 10.0%.

Alabama 

Incumbent Republican Richard Shelby won re-election to a fifth term. On November 9, 1994, Shelby switched his party affiliation from Democratic to Republican, one day after the Republicans won control of both houses in the midterm elections, giving the Republicans a 53-47 majority in the Senate. He won his first full term as a Republican in 1998 by a large margin, and faced no significant opposition in 2004 and 2010.

Shelby had over $17 million in the bank, one of the highest of any candidate in the country. He had become even more popular in his opposition to the Troubled Asset Relief Program (TARP) and the Emergency Economic Stabilization Act of 2008, as the ranking member of the Senate Banking Committee.

In May, Shelby told reporters "I don't even know who my opponent is."

Alaska 

The November general election in Alaska was preceded by primary elections which were held August 24, 2010. Scott McAdams, the Mayor of Sitka, became the Democratic nominee and Joe Miller, an attorney and former federal magistrate, became the Republican nominee after defeating incumbent Senator Lisa Murkowski in the Republican primary.

Murkowski garnered more than 100,000 write-in votes in the general election, many of which were challenged by Miller for various errors including minor misspellings. The appeal was denied Even if all the challenged votes were thrown out, Murkowski would have still had a lead of over 2,100 votes.

Arizona 

Incumbent Republican John McCain, who returned to the Senate after losing the presidency to Barack Obama in the 2008 presidential election, ran for re-election to a fifth term and won.

After spending over $20 million during the primaries, McCain still had more than $1million cash on hand after the primary election. Glassman criticized McCain on women's issues. In August 2010, Glassman released a TV advertisement called "Arizona First."

Arkansas 

Incumbent Democrat Blanche Lincoln ran for re-election to a third term, but lost to Republican nominee John Boozman. Boozman became the first Republican in 138 years to win the seat. Arkansas had previously only elected one Republican senator since the Reconstruction, who was defeated after his first term in 2002 by Mark Pryor.

The Republican primary was held May 18, 2010, with early voting from May 3–17.

California 

Incumbent Democrat Barbara Boxer won re-election to a fourth term.

In 2009, Boxer was criticized for correcting a general who called her "ma'am". Brigadier General Michael Walsh was testifying on the Louisiana coastal restoration process in the wake of Hurricane Katrina and answered Boxer's query with "ma'am" when Boxer interrupted him. "Do me a favor," Boxer said. "can you say 'senator' instead of 'ma'am?'" "Yes, ma'am," Walsh interjected. "It's just a thing, I worked so hard to get that title, so I'd appreciate it. Thank you," she said. The Army's guide to protocol instructs service members to call members of the U.S. Senate "sir", "ma'am" or "senator". Fiorina used this incident prominently in campaign ads, as did David Zucker, who directed a humorous commercial for RightChange.com titled 'Call Me Senator.'  In February 2010, Carly Fiorina put out a campaign ad attacking Republican rival Tom Campbell featuring a "demon sheep", creating international, mostly negative, publicity.

Colorado 

In December 2008, President-elect Barack Obama selected incumbent U.S. Senator Ken Salazar to become U.S. Secretary of the Interior. After Salazar resigned from his seat, Democratic Governor Bill Ritter appointed Denver Public Schools Superintendent Michael Bennet to fill the seat, who won re-election to his first full term.

This was one of the most expensive elections in the 2010 cycle, with more than $50 million spent total, including over $35 million in outside spending. Conservative third party groups hammered Bennet for voting 92% of the time with the Democratic leadership, including voting for healthcare reform and the stimulus package. Liberal third party groups called Buck extremist. Bennet focused on attacking Buck's views on abortion, which he believed should be banned including those of cases of rape and incest. He was also attacked for wanting to eliminate the 17th Amendment and refusing to prosecute an alleged rapist as Weld County district attorney. Planned Parenthood mounted a mail campaign, targeting women voters with the warning that "Colorado women can't trust Ken Buck." Bennet won the women vote by 17 points according to exit polls. After the election, Buck conceded to the Denver Post that the main reason why he lost is because of social issues.

Connecticut 

Incumbent Democrat Christopher Dodd suffered from dropping approval ratings in the past few years due to major controversies, leading him to announce in January 2010 that he would retire, instead of seeking a sixth term. As Dodd was a Democrat, Richard Blumenthal, incumbent State Attorney General, announced on the same day that he would run for Dodd's seat. The Connecticut Democratic Party nominated Blumenthal on May 21. Businesswoman Linda McMahon won the state party's nominating convention and the August 10 Republican primary to become the Republican candidate.

Delaware (special) 

This was a special election to fill Delaware's Class 2 Senate seat, then held by Ted Kaufman, an appointee. The seat had been previously held by long-time Senator Joe Biden, who vacated it when he became Vice President of the United States in 2009.

Florida 

Incumbent Republican Senator Mel Martínez, who was elected in a very close race against Democrat Betty Castor with 49% of the vote in 2004, announced on December 2, 2008, that he would not run for re-election to a second term, then announcing on August 7, 2009, that he would resign prior to the end of his term. The Governor of Florida, Republican Charlie Crist, was required to appoint a successor and he chose his former Chief of Staff, George LeMieux. LeMieux, a placeholder who did not run in the election, replaced Martínez in the Senate on September 10, 2009.

Crist publicly announced he was running for the seat in mid-2009. When he declared his candidacy, he received many Republican endorsements, including the National Republican Senatorial Committee, Martínez, and 2008 Republican presidential nominee John McCain. However, his support of the American Recovery and Reinvestment Act of 2009 hurt his popularity among conservatives, and Tea Party candidate Marco Rubio, the former Speaker of the Florida House of Representatives, surged in the polls. In April 2010, Crist announced he would drop out of the Republican primary and run as an Independent. The National Republican Senatorial Committee withdrew its endorsement of Crist and demanded a refund of its campaign funds that it provided for the Crist campaign. Rubio went on to win the Republican primary against only token opposition.

Polling initially showed Crist neck and neck with Rubio, but by the end of August Rubio opened up a solid and consistent lead. He was supported by Republican and some Independent voters whereas Democratic and other Independents were split between Crist and Meek. Rubio went on to win the election with 49% of the vote to Crist's 30% and Meek's 20%.

Georgia 

Incumbent Republican Johnny Isakson won re-election to a second term.

Hawaii 

Incumbent Democrat and President pro tempore Daniel Inouye won re-election to his ninth term.

Hawaii last elected a Republican Senator in 1970, and its current delegation to the United States Congress currently consists entirely of Democrats. Democrats have also won Hawaii's electoral votes in every presidential election since Ronald Reagan's landslide election in 1984. The exceptions at the time were then-Governor Linda Lingle (who was serving her second and final term) and then-U.S. Representative Charles Djou, both of whom were Republicans.

Idaho 

Incumbent Republican Mike Crapo won re-election to a third term.

Sullivan, a heavy underdog, criticized Crapo for being in Washington for too long saying "Senator Crapo has been in Congress for 18 years. The country is struggling, and I think it's time to make a change." Crapo emphasized his conservative record in Washington.

Illinois 

Incumbent Democrat Roland Burris did not run in 2010. He suffered from poor approval ratings and was investigated by the Sangamon County, Illinois State's Attorney for perjury. Although no criminal charges were filed against him, he faced an investigation by the Senate Ethics Committee.

There were two ballot items for the same seat: a regular election, to fill the Class 3 seat beginning with the 112th United States Congress beginning on January 3, 2011, and a special election, to fill that seat for the final weeks of the 111th Congress, replacing the temporary appointment of Roland Burris to the vacancy created by Barack Obama's election to the presidency.

A federal court ruled that the candidates appearing on the ballot for the replacement election would be the ones of the regular election, and that the special election would appear after the regular election on the ballot.

, this was the last Senate election in Illinois won by a Republican.

Illinois (special)

Illinois (regular)

Indiana 

Incumbent Democrat Evan Bayh decided in February 2010 to retire instead of seeking a third term shortly after former U.S. Senator Dan Coats announced his candidacy for Bayh's contested seat. No Democratic candidate submitted enough signatures by the deadline to run, leading Democratic officials to choose U.S. Congressman Brad Ellsworth to be the nominee. Coats won the election.

After Coats's win in the Republican primary, Ellsworth began to heavily criticize Coats for his ties to lobbyists. He called for more disclosure of the meetings lawmakers have with lobbyists, banning congressional staff from lobbying for six years after their congressional jobs, requiring Congress members to put all their investments in blind trusts, more disclosure of Senate candidates' personal financial information, and changes to the U.S. Senate filibuster rules. He proposed lowering number of votes required to break a filibuster to 55 from the current 60. In response to Ellsworth's charges, Coats published his lobbying record in an 815-page document.

Coats emphasized the individual issues rather than ethics reforms advocated by his opponent. He focused on Ellsworth's record of voting in support of the Economic Stimulus Act of 2008, cap-and-trade legislation, and health care bill. Coats opinion of the healthcare law was that "the only responsible solution ... is to repeal the Obama-Pelosi-Ellsworth health spending bill and quickly replace it with cost-effective, incremental pieces that will decrease costs, increase coverage and not break the bank."

Iowa 

Incumbent Republican Chuck Grassley won re-election to a sixth term.

Incumbent Chuck Grassley started the campaign moderately popular, but his approval ratings dropped somewhat during the campaign. However, the seat continued to be considered to be "Safe Republican" by many sources, with CQ Politics noting that Grassley is "one of Iowa's most durable politicians."

Conlin described herself as a "prairie progressive." She supported the recent landmark case of Varnum v. Brien, which legalized gay marriage in the state. She also supported repeal of "don't ask, don't tell."

Before the election, former political advisor John Maxwell claimed that Grassley would have his toughest race since his first U.S. Senate election in 1980, where he defeated incumbent John Culver with 53% of the vote. Grassley won all of his four re-election bids with nearly 70% of the vote against unknown opponents. Grassley won the election with 64.51% of the vote.

Kansas 

Incumbent Republican Sam Brownback retired to run for Governor of Kansas, instead of seeking a third term. Republican nominee Jerry Moran won the open seat. Kansas is one of the most Republican states in the nation; no Democrat has been elected to either Senate seat since 1932.

The retirement of Brownback, a popular U.S. Senator, led to a heavily competitive primary election. Tiahrt, who was on the Committee of Appropriations, had been accused of excessive earmarking while he was in Congress. From 2006 to 2008, Tiahrt had requested and supported a total of 63 solo earmarks, costing $53.9 million. In the same period, Moran had requested and supported a total of 29 earmarks, with a pricetag of $13.4 million.

After the primaries, Moran chose not to release any more negative advertisements. Democrat Lisa Johnston ran a low-profile, quiet race. On election day, she won only two counties: Wyandotte County and Douglas County, while Moran won statewide by a landslide.

Kentucky 

Incumbent Republican Jim Bunning retired instead of seeking a third term. Republican nominee Rand Paul won the open seat.

On May 18, 2010, Paul won the Republican nomination. After conceding the election to Paul, Grayson said, "It's time to put all differences aside, unite behind Dr. Paul, he needs our help and I for one stand ready to serve".

Grayson attacked Paul for his "strange ideas," such as his opposition of the PATRIOT Act, and what Grayson alleged to be his support of closing down Guantanamo Bay and saying that Iran was not a threat. He also attacked Paul for being a Duke University fan. He sent out another TV ad and web video that stirred controversy by making the case that Paul believes that foreign policy decisions made prior to September 11, 2001, are partially to blame for the attacks. Paul immediately responded by launching a statewide television ad in which he expresses his "outrage at terrorists who killed 3,000 innocents" before accusing Grayson of a "lie" and a "shameful" tactic. Grayson accused the Fox News Channel of favoring Paul over him.

Conway began the race trailing Paul, but as he attacked his opponent's positions on social-welfare and criminal-justice policies, the polls began to tighten. The campaign attracted $8.5 million in contributions from outside groups, of which $6 million was spent to help Rand Paul and $2.5 million to help Conway. This money influx was in addition to the money spent by the candidates themselves: $6 million by Paul and $4.7 million by Conway.

Louisiana 

Incumbent Republican David Vitter won re-election to a second term. Some speculated that Vitter's re-election might have become complicated, by the prostitution scandal revealed in 2007, but he continued to lead in aggregate polling against potential opponents.

Melançon heavily criticized Vitter for prostitution sex scandal. Vitter released television advertising criticizing Melancon for his support for Obama's stimulus package and his support for amnesty for illegal immigrants.  Melancon claimed "In August, Melancon challenged Vitter to a series of five live, televised town hall-style debates across the state. In his 2004 campaign for Senate, Vitter committed to five live, televised debates. Since Melancon issued the challenge, Vitter and Melancon have been invited to a total of seven live, televised debates. Vitter only accepted invitations to debates hosted by WWL-TV and WDSU-TV, both in New Orleans."

Maryland 

Incumbent Democrat Barbara Mikulski won re-election to a fifth term.

Republican nominee Eric Wargotz, Queen Anne's County, Maryland Commission President and physician, compared Mikulski to a dinosaur by calling her a political "insidersaurus" for being in Washington for over thirty years An ad showed a hammer hitting a brick wall, breaking it down and citing criticisms of Mikulski's record as a U.S. Senator. Mikulski released advertisements emphasizing education and job creation.  Despite Wargotz's limited campaign and resources he received the highest percentage of votes against Mikulski as an incumbent U.S. Senator

Massachusetts (special) 

A special election was held January 19, 2010 to fill the Class 1 seat for the remainder of the term ending January 3, 2013. It was won by Republican Scott Brown.

Incumbent Democrat Ted Kennedy had died August 25, 2009.  Governor of Massachusetts appointed Democrat Paul Kirk September 24, 2009 to continue the term pending this special election, in which Kirk was not a candidate.

The election was viewed by conservatives outside of Massachusetts as a referendum against President Barack Obama. But Brown stated that he didn't believe that it was a referendum on Obama. Although Democrats would retain control of both Houses of Congress until January 2011, Brown's victory greatly affected their political plans, most notably for the Patient Protection and Affordable Care Act, though the legislation was signed into law two months later.

Missouri 

Incumbent Republican Kit Bond retired instead of seeking a fifth term. Republican nominee Roy Blunt won the open seat.

Democrat Robin Carnahan and national Democrats heavily criticized Blunt for his support of bailouts, calling him "Bailout Blunt." Blunt criticized her for supporting President Obama's stimulus package, the cap-and-trade energy bill, and the health care reform bill.

Nevada 

Incumbent Democratic Majority Leader Harry Reid won re-election to a fifth term.

Reid was initially considered vulnerable, with the non-partisan Cook Political Report rating the election as a toss-up and the Rothenberg Political Report rating the state as toss-up. A June 9, 2010, Rasmussen Reports post-primary poll showed Angle leading incumbent Senator Harry Reid by a margin of 50% to 39%. However, a July 2010 poll showed Senator Reid leading Angle by 7 points, following nationwide attention to some of Angle's positions, as well as the endorsement of Reid by prominent Republicans. The change of margin, 18% in less than a month, is the largest in Senate elections history. On July 28, 2010, Rasmussen Reports moved the race from toss-up to leans Democratic. Later, it moved back to toss-up. Despite Angle leading by three points in the polls the days leading up to the election, Reid defeated her by 5.74%, even in her own county, Washoe County. Reid also secured huge numbers out of the Democratic stronghold of Clark County, which covers the Las Vegas Metropolitan Area.

New Hampshire 

Incumbent Republican Judd Gregg retired instead of seeking a fourth term. Republican nominee Kelly Ayotte won the open seat by over 23 points, after winning a close party primary. New Hampshire trended Democratic in the 2006 and 2008 elections, with Republican incumbents losing both of the state's House seats and its other Senate seat to Democrats, but polling conducted in late December 2008 showed Gregg defeating both of the state's U.S. Representatives in a hypothetical match-up.

Democrat Paul Hodes called himself a fiscal conservative, which was mocked by Republican Kelly Ayotte in a TV ad. Hodes was criticized for supporting President Obama's Economic Recovery package, a carbon energy tax, and Affordable Care Act. Hodes criticized Ayotte for numerous controversies. One ad was questioned Ayotte's honesty in dealing with the Lakes Region Ponzi scheme which defrauded investors of almost $80 million.

New York 
There were two elections, due to the resignation of Hillary Clinton in January 2009 to become the U.S. Secretary of State. Both senate races, along with the New York gubernatorial election, one with a vulnerable Democratic incumbent and the other an open race, respectively, was believed to lead major New York Republicans to gravitate towards them rather than challenge the popular Schumer. As it happened, however, New York Republicans had difficulty drawing top-tier candidates to any of the three races.

New York (regular) 

Incumbent Democrat Chuck Schumer won re-election to a third term.

New York (special) 

Governor David Paterson had appointed Democrat Kirsten Gillibrand to serve as United States Senator this special election, replacing former Senator Hillary Clinton, who resigned to serve as U.S. Secretary of State in the Barack Obama administration. The winner of the special election would complete the term ending in January 2013. Due to this special election, this was the first time since the ratification of the 17th Amendment in 1913 that all of New York's six statewide offices were up for popular election on the same date.

Gillibrand claimed to be an independent thinker and takes a back seat to no one. She also released television advertising touting her experience as from upstate New York. DioGuardi criticized Gillibrand's recent photos in Vogue magazine.

.9

North Carolina 

Incumbent Republican Richard Burr won re-election to a second term. Burr was the first incumbent to win re-election for this seat since Sam Ervin's last re-election in 1968. Burr's 54.8% also represented the highest vote share a North Carolina Republican received since the state began directly electing its senators.

This Senate seat was unfavorable to incumbents over the past several decades. No person elected to this seat was re-elected since Sam Ervin in 1968. His successor, Democrat Robert Burren Morgan, was defeated for re-election in 1980, along with many other incumbents from his party. His Republican successor, John Porter East, committed suicide in 1986. East's appointed successor, Jim Broyhill, served for just four months, resigning upon his November 1986 election loss to former Democratic Governor Terry Sanford. In 1992, the seat changed hands yet again, as Sanford was defeated by wealthy GOP businessman Lauch Faircloth, who himself lost in his bid for a second term six years later by John Edwards. In 2004, no incumbent was defeated, as Edwards was running for vice president and was not allowed to be on the ballot in both races. However, that year the seat did change parties for the fifth time in a row, with Richard Burr defeating Bill Clinton's onetime Chief of Staff Erskine Bowles.

* Note: Since no candidate received 40% of the vote on May 4, state law allowed a runoff (or "second primary") election if requested by the second-place finisher. Cunningham requested such a runoff.

North Dakota 

Incumbent Democrat Byron Dorgan did not seek re-election. Republican Governor John Hoeven won the open seat. Incumbent Byron Dorgan never had a difficult time getting elected, as he obtained 59%, 63%, and 68% in his three senate election bids, respectively. However, in December 2009, Rasmussen Reports conducted a hypothetical matchup of Governor John Hoeven against the incumbent. Hoeven led by a large margin, 58% to Dorgan's 36%. 61% of the state still had a favorable view of Dorgan, and if pitted against State Senator Duane Sand, the incumbent led 52% to 37%.

Hoeven was challenged in the race by North Dakota State Senator Tracy Potter of Bismarck. Potter received the endorsement of the North Dakota Democratic-NPL Party at its state convention on March 27, 2010. Governor Hoeven and Senator Potter advanced to the November 2, 2010 general election following balloting in North Dakota's primary election, which was held June 8, 2010. Neither candidate faced any significant opposition in the primary election.

Ohio 

Incumbent Republican George Voinovich retired instead of seeking a third term. Republican former Director of the Office of Management and Budget, United States Trade Representative, and Congressman Rob Portman won the open seat.

Originally, the election was seen as a toss-up. His experience as a former Bush official was considered to be a big problem for Portman. Both President Barack Obama and Vice President Joe Biden campaigned for Fisher.  Television advertisements were very negative. Fisher attacked Portman for helping to ship jobs overseas during his entire political career, backing deals that shipped jobs overseas, and the trade deficit with China, which grew by over $41 billion. Portman claimed in response that most jobs were being lost to other states, not countries. Portman attacked Fisher for supporting Obama's stimulus and cap and trade.

Winning the election, Portman received the majority of votes in 82 of 88 counties and in 15 of 18 Congressional districts, including the district of liberal U.S. Congressman Dennis Kucinich.

Oklahoma 

Incumbent first-term Republican Tom Coburn won re-election to a second term. Coburn, a very popular incumbent, promised to limit himself to two terms. Despite his popularity, he did release television advertisements. In 2009, Coburn's approval rating in a PPP poll was 59%, including a 39% approval rating among Democrats. His Democratic opponent is a perennial candidate who did little campaigning.

Oregon 

Incumbent Democrat Ron Wyden won re-election to a third full term. Wyden, a popular incumbent with a 52% approval rating in a July poll, touted bipartisanship and promised to hold town-hall meetings annually in each of Oregon's 36 counties and to open offices outside of Portland and Salem. A Survey USA poll taken a few days before the election showed that 23% of Republicans supported Wyden.

Huffman, widely considered as an underdog, financed his own campaign. He defended bonuses for Wall Street executives and questioned global warming.

Pennsylvania 

Incumbent Republican-turned-Democrat Arlen Specter ran for re-election to a sixth term, but he lost in the Democratic primary to Joe Sestak. Republican nominee Pat Toomey then won the seat.

South Carolina 

Incumbent Republican Jim DeMint won re-election to a second term. Alvin Greene, the Democratic nominee, was the first major-party African-American U.S. Senate candidate in South Carolina since Reconstruction. Alvin Greene's Democratic primary election win and his margin of victory surprised pundits. As of the primary, he had held no public campaign events, raised no money, and did not have a campaign website. A review of the primary election showed that of the state's 46 counties, half had a significant gap between the absentee and primary day ballots. For example, in Lancaster County, Vic Rawl won the absentees with 84 percent, while Greene won primary day by a double-digit margin. Rawl's campaign manager also claimed, "In only two of 88 precincts, do the number of votes Greene got plus the number we got equal the total cast."

South Dakota 

Incumbent Republican John Thune won re-election to a second term unopposed.

Thune was narrowly elected to his first term over Democratic Senate Minority Leader Tom Daschle with 51% of the vote in 2004. In spite of his lack of seniority, Thune rose to the position of chairman of the Republican Policy Committee in the United States Senate.

No members of the South Dakota Democratic Party (or any other party) filed to challenge Thune. Scott Heidepriem, the South Dakota Senate Minority Leader and a Democratic candidate for Governor of South Dakota, said, "We just concluded that John Thune is an extremely popular senator who is going to win another term in the Senate."

Utah 

Incumbent Republican Bob Bennett was seeking re-election to a fourth term, but was eliminated in the GOP state convention. Republican Mike Lee, who won the Republican primary, won the open seat.

At the Republican convention, incumbent Senator Bob Bennett finished third in balloting among delegates and was eliminated from the race. Business owner Tim Bridgewater finished first and attorney Mike Lee finished second, but Bridgewater did not receive enough votes to avoid a primary election runoff against Lee. At the Democratic convention, delegates nominated businessman Sam Granato, who received 77.5 percent of the vote.

Vermont 

Incumbent Democrat Patrick Leahy easily won re-election to a seventh term.

Washington 

Incumbent Democrat Patty Murray won re-election to a fourth term.

Republican Dino Rossi heavily criticized Murray for her support of the 2009 economic stimulus package; however, Rossi's economic promises are nearly identical to those of President Bush who asked for the stimulus. Rossi supports repealing the Patient Protection and Affordable Care Act and the Dodd-Frank Wall Street Reform and Consumer Protection Act. He also criticized Murray for her support for earmarks. In response, Murray said, "You bet that seniority and leadership has a big thing to do with it, but the other part of it is, I get up every day and I work hard and I believe in this and I am going to continue fighting for the community I represent."

West Virginia (special) 

Long-time Democratic Senator Robert Byrd died June 28, 2010, and Democratic Governor Joe Manchin appointed Carte Goodwin to temporarily fill the vacancy. Goodwin pledged to not run for election to the seat in exchange for the appointment.  Manchin won the open seat and served out the remainder of Byrd's elected term, which ended on January 3, 2013.

During the Republican primary campaign, only Raese and Warner released television advertisements.

Wisconsin 

Incumbent Democrat Russ Feingold ran for re-election to a fourth term, but was defeated by political newcomer, Republican Ron Johnson.  Johnson, a millionaire manufacturer and Tea Party movement favorite who was running for his first political office, was the front runner. In response to controversy over his ownership of stock in BP, Johnson said he would sell it when market conditions were favorable and possibly use the proceeds to help finance his Senate campaign.  Feingold's first television ad was a positive ad released in March. In July 2010, Feingold's second 2010 television election ad attacked Johnson for alleged support for offshore drilling in the Great Lakes. Johnson quickly countered Feingold with a television ad of his own. Feingold's logo was Moving Forward. In one ad he emphasized independence and called himself a "Penny Pincher." Johnson argued that his professions, manufacturer and accountant were underrepresented in the U.S. Senate, and there were too many lawyers (57 out of 100 members), including Feingold.

See also 
 2010 United States elections
 2010 United States gubernatorial elections
 2010 United States House of Representatives elections
 111th United States Congress
 112th United States Congress

Notes

References

Further reading

External links 
  - Shows which party controlled the Senate (as well as the House and Presidency) going back to 1945.
 , Candidates for U.S. Congress
 U.S. Senate from OurCampaigns.com
  Congressional Races in 2010] from Open Secrets (campaign contributions)